Kris Temmerman (born 2 February 1973) is a Belgian football midfielder.

References

1975 births
Living people
Belgian footballers
Belgium under-21 international footballers
S.C. Eendracht Aalst players
R.W.D. Molenbeek players
Belgian Pro League players
Challenger Pro League players
Association football midfielders